Leandro Narloch (1978 in Curitiba, Paraná) is a Brazilian journalist and writer. He worked as a reporter at Veja magazine and as an editor  at Aventuras na História and Superinteressante magazines, all published by Grupo Abril.

He became notorious in 2009, when he published his controversial debut book Guia Politicamente Incorreto da História do Brasil (can be translated as Politically Incorrect Guide to the History of Brazil), a work in which he tries to tear down supposed misconceptions built around important people and events of Brazilian history. the book became a best-seller in Brazil.

In 2011, Narloch released the sequel for his first book, Guia Politicamente Incorreto da América Latina (Politically Incorrect Guide to Latin America), in which Leandro adopts the same line of work, only this time focusing in the History of Latin America in general. In August 2013, he released the third book of the series, Guia Politicamente Incorreto da História do Mundo, which covers world history.

References 

1978 births
Living people
Brazilian journalists
People from Curitiba
Brazilian non-fiction writers
Federal University of Paraná alumni
Brazilian anti-communists